Mackenzie Ward (20 February 1903 – January 1976) was a British stage and film actor.

Filmography

Bibliography
 Low, Rachael. History of the British Film: Filmmaking in 1930s Britain. George Allen & Unwin, 1985 .

References

External links

1903 births
1976 deaths
English male film actors
English male stage actors
People from Eastbourne
20th-century English male actors
British expatriate male actors in the United States